The 1959 Iowa State Cyclones football team represented Iowa State University in the Big Seven Conference during the 1959 NCAA University Division football season. In their second year under head coach Clay Stapleton, the Cyclones compiled a 7–3 record (3–3 against conference opponents), tied for third place in the conference, and outscored their opponents by a combined total of 248 to 80. They played their home games at Clyde Williams Field in Ames, Iowa. The team became known in the school's history as the "Dirty Thirty", named after the number of players left from the original fifty-five but otherwise celebrated for its perseverance and hard-nosed play.

The team's regular starting lineup on offense consisted of left end Bob Anderson, left tackle Jerry Schoenfelder, left guard Tom Ferrebee, center Arden Esslinger, right guard Dan Celoni, right tackle Larry Van Der Heyden, right end Don Webb, quarterback Cliff Rick, left halfback Dwight Nichols, right halfback Mike Fitzgerald, and fullback Tom Watkins. Dwight Nichols was the team captain.

The team's statistical leaders included Tom Watkins with 843 rushing yards, Dwight Nichols with 609 passing yards, Don Webb with 309 receiving yards, and Dwight Nichols and Tom Watkins with 54 points scored (nine touchdowns) each. Three Iowa State players were selected as first-team all-conference players: Dwight Nichols, Tom Watkins, and Don Webb.

Schedule

References

Iowa State
Iowa State Cyclones football seasons
Iowa State Cyclones football